Diego Nicolás Rojas Orellana (born 15 February 1995) is a Chilean footballer who plays as attacking midfielder for SJK in the Finnish Veikkausliiga.

Club career
Rojas debuts at UC in the national tournament play from the 55 minute to Cobresal.

On 1 February 2022, Rojas signed with SJK in Finland.

Honors
Universidad Católica
 Primera División de Chile: 2016 Clausura, 2018
 Supercopa de Chile: 2019

References

External links

Profile at Cruzados	

1995 births
Living people
People from Antofagasta
Chilean footballers
Chile youth international footballers
Chile under-20 international footballers
Association football midfielders
Club Deportivo Universidad Católica footballers
Everton de Viña del Mar footballers
Club Deportivo Palestino footballers
Unión La Calera footballers
Deportes Valdivia footballers
San Luis de Quillota footballers
Seinäjoen Jalkapallokerho players
Chilean Primera División players
Primera B de Chile players
Veikkausliiga players
2015 South American Youth Football Championship players
Chilean expatriate footballers
Expatriate footballers in Finland
Chilean expatriate sportspeople in Finland